The Mask of Zorro is a 1998 American swashbuckler film based on the character of the masked vigilante Zorro created by Johnston McCulley. It was directed by Martin Campbell and stars Antonio Banderas, Anthony Hopkins, Catherine Zeta-Jones, and Stuart Wilson. The film features the original Zorro, Don Diego de la Vega (Hopkins),  escaping from prison to find his long-lost daughter (Zeta-Jones) and avenge the death of his wife at the hands of the corrupt governor Rafael Montero (Wilson). He is aided by his successor (Banderas), who is pursuing his own vendetta against the governor's right-hand man while falling in love with de la Vega's daughter.

Executive producer Steven Spielberg had initially developed the film for TriStar Pictures with directors Mikael Salomon and Robert Rodriguez, before Campbell signed on in 1996. Salomon cast Sean Connery as Don Diego de la Vega, while Rodriguez brought Banderas in the lead role. Connery dropped out and was replaced with Hopkins, and The Mask of Zorro began filming in January 1997 at Estudios Churubusco in Mexico City, Mexico.

The film was released in the United States on July 17, 1998 to critical and commercial success, grossing $250 million on a $95 million budget. The Legend of Zorro, a sequel also starring Banderas and Zeta-Jones and directed by Campbell, was released in 2005, but did not fare as well as its predecessor.

Plot
In 1821, Don Diego de la Vega, a Spanish-born California nobleman, fights against the Spanish in the Mexican War of Independence as Zorro, a mysterious masked swordsman who defends the Mexican peasants and commoners of Las Californias. Don Rafael Montero, the corrupt governor of the region, sets a trap for Zorro at a public execution of three innocent peasants. Zorro stops the execution, and Montero's soldiers are thwarted by two young brothers, Alejandro and Joaquin Murrieta. Zorro fights the remaining Spanish soldiers and thanks the Murrieta brothers by giving Joaquin a silver medallion. Don Montero suspects de la Vega of being Zorro and attempts to arrest him at his home. A swordfight begins, a fire breaks out, and de la Vega's wife Esperanza, whom Montero held unrequited love for, is shot and killed during the ensuing scuffle. While Diego's home burns, Montero takes his infant daughter, Elena, as his own before sending de la Vega to an underground prison cave and returning to Spain.

In 1841, Alejandro and Joaquin are bandits, running a scam with Three-Fingered Jack to collect the bounty on their heads and steal a strongbox. Before they can escape with the money, they are caught by Captain Harrison Love, Montero's new American right-hand man. Jack and Joaquin are captured while Alejandro escapes, and Joaquin shoots himself rather than be executed by Captain Love. Love then beheads Joaquin's corpse and takes the head. Montero returns to California as a civilian, alongside Elena, who has grown into a beautiful woman and resembles her late mother. Montero's reappearance motivates de la Vega to escape captivity. He encounters Alejandro getting drunk and recognizes the silver medallion he gave his brother as a boy. De la Vega learns Murietta is on a similar quest for vengeance on Captain Love for his brother's death and agrees to make Alejandro his protégé in order for them to battle their respective enemies. Alejandro agrees to undergo de la Vega's training regimen in Zorro's secret cave underneath the ruins of his family estate to be able to take revenge. In addition, Alejandro seeks to succeed de la Vega as Zorro. 

While still being trained, Alejandro steals a black stallion resembling Zorro's steed Tornado from the local garrison. De la Vega scolds Alejandro, claiming that Zorro was a servant of the people, not a thief and adventurer. He challenges Alejandro to gain Montero's trust instead. Alejandro poses as a visiting nobleman named Don Alejandro del Castillo y García, with de la Vega as his servant "Bernardo", and attends a party at Montero's hacienda. At the party, he earns Elena's admiration and enough of Montero's trust to be invited to a secret meeting where several other noblemen are present. Montero hints at a plan to retake California for the Dons and proclaim it as an independent republic by buying it from General Santa Anna, who needs money for the upcoming Mexican–American War.

Montero takes Alejandro and the noblemen to a secret gold mine known as "El Dorado", where peasants and prisoners are used for slave labor. Montero plans to buy California from Santa Anna using gold mined from Santa Anna's own land. As the servant "Bernardo", de la Vega uses this opportunity to become closer to Elena and learns that Montero told Elena that her mother died in childbirth. While walking in a market, Elena meets the woman who was her nanny, who tells Elena her parents' real identity. De la Vega sends Alejandro, now Zorro, to steal Montero's map leading to the gold mine. Zorro duels Montero, Love, and their guards at the hacienda. When Zorro escapes, Elena attempts to retrieve Montero's map from the swordsman. A brief but erotic sword duel ensues, and Zorro gives her a passionate kiss before he flees.

Terrified of Santa Anna's retribution if he discovers that he is being paid with his own gold, Montero decides to destroy the mine and kill the workers at Love's urging. De la Vega tells Alejandro to release the workers on his own so that de la Vega can reclaim Elena. Alejandro sets off, feeling betrayed by Diego's vendetta. De la Vega corners Montero at the hacienda and reveals his identity, but Montero captures him by threatening to shoot him in front of Elena. As he is taken away, de la Vega tells Elena the name of the flowers, romneya, that she recognized upon her arrival in California, convincing her that he is her father. She releases de la Vega from his cell. They proceed to the mine, where Alejandro and de la Vega respectively defeat and slay Love and Montero, avenging Joaquin and Esperanza. Elena and Alejandro free the workers before the explosives go off and find the mortally wounded de la Vega. He makes peace with Alejandro and Elena and gives his blessings for Alejandro to continue as Zorro and to marry his daughter before dying.

Sometime later, Alejandro and Elena are married and rebuilt the de la Vega hacienda. Alejandro tells stories to their infant son, Joaquin, whom he named after his brother, of his grandfather's heroic deeds and legacy as Zorro.

Cast

 Antonio Banderas as Alejandro Murrieta / Zorro:Banderas was paid $5 million for the role. The character of Alejandro Murrieta was conceived as the fictional brother of the real-life Joaquin Murrieta, making the character either Mexican or Chilean. To prepare for his role, Banderas practiced with the Olympic fencing team in Spain for four months, before studying additional fencing and swordsmanship with Anthony Hopkins and Catherine Zeta-Jones. The three were trained by Bob Anderson during pre-production in Mexico, spending 10 hours a day for two months specifically on fight scenes from the film. "We used to call him Grumpy Bob on the set, he was such a perfectionist," director Martin Campbell reflected. "He was incredibly inventive, and also refused to treat any of the actors as stars. They would complain about the intensity of the training, but having worked with him there's nobody I'd rather use." During interviews for The Lord of the Rings: The Fellowship of the Ring, Anderson rated Banderas the best natural talent he had worked with. Before Banderas was chosen for the role,  Benicio Del Toro, Andy García, Marc Anthony, Joaquim de Almeida, and Chayanne were considered.
 José María de Tavira portrays a young Alejandro Murrieta.
 Anthony Hopkins as Don Diego de la Vega / Zorro:Hopkins was cast in December 1996, one month before filming began. Hopkins, known for his dramatic acting, took up the role because of his enthusiasm to be in an action film. For the role of Diego de la Vega, actors Sean Connery and Raúl Juliá, who died before he could take the role, were also considered.
 Catherine Zeta-Jones as Elena Montero:The actress signed on in November 1996, when Spielberg saw her performance in the Titanic miniseries and recommended her to Campbell. Despite being a Welsh actress portraying a Spanish character, Zeta-Jones discovered similarities between her "volatile" Celtic temper and the Latin temperament of Eléna. Izabella Scorupco, who worked with Campbell on GoldenEye, Judith Godrèche, Salma Hayek, Shakira and Jennifer Lopez screen tested for the part. Zeta-Jones credits The Mask of Zorro as her breakthrough in entering A-list recognition.
 María and Mónica Fernández Cruz portray Elena de la Vega (infant).
 Stuart Wilson as Don Rafael Montero:Armand Assante had initially been cast in the role, but dropped out due to scheduling conflicts with The Odyssey. Stuart Wilson, who Campbell previously directed in No Escape, was cast in Assante's place four months after. Actors Sam Shepard, Lance Henriksen, Edward James Olmos, Scott Glenn and Giancarlo Giannini were also considered for the role.
 Matt Letscher as Captain Harrison Love
 Tony Amendola as Don Luiz
 Pedro Armendáriz, Jr. as Don Pedro
 Victor Rivers as Joaquin Murrieta
 Diego Sieres as Young Joaquín Murrieta
 William Marquez, as Fray Felipe
 L. Q. Jones as Three-fingered Jack
 Julieta Rosen as Esperanza De La Vega: Don Diego's beloved wife and Elena's mother
 Maury Chaykin as Prison Warden

Production

Development

In October 1992, TriStar Pictures and Steven Spielberg's Amblin Entertainment were planning to start production on Zorro the following year, and hired Joel Gross to rewrite the script after they were impressed with his adaptation of The Three Musketeers. At the time, Spielberg was producing Zorro with the potential to direct. Gross completed his rewrite in March 1993, and TriStar entered pre-production, creating early promotion for the film that same month at the ShoWest trade show. By December 1993, Branko Lustig was producing the film with Spielberg, and Mikael Salomon was attached as director. In August 1994, Sean Connery was cast as Don Diego de la Vega, while Salomon stated that the rest of the major cast would be Hispanic or Latino. The first chosen for the role of Zorro in his young version was Andy García, a fashionable Latin actor at the time. Colombian singer Shakira was also initially considered to play Elena but turned it down due to her limited acting experience (despite having co-starred in the Colombian TV series El Oasis) and poor English skills at the time. Pre-production proceeded even further in August when Salomon compiled test footage for a planned April 1995 start date.

Connery and Salomon eventually dropped out, and in September 1995, Robert Rodriguez, fresh off the success of Desperado, signed to direct with Antonio Banderas, who had also starred in Desperado, playing the title role. TriStar and Amblin had been surprised by Rodriguez's low-budget filming techniques for his action films, El Mariachi and Desperado, and shifted away from their initial plans with Salomon to make a big-budget version of Zorro. Spielberg had hoped Rodriguez would start filming in January 1996 for a Christmas release date, but the start date was pushed back to July. The release date was later moved to Easter 1997. Rodriguez pulled out of the film in June 1996 over difficulties coming to terms with TriStar on the budget. The studio projected a range of $35 million, while Rodriguez wanted $45 million. They both attempted to compromise when Rodriguez lowered it to $42 million, but the studio refused and set $41 million as their highest mark. Banderas remained with the production, and Martin Campbell signed on later that month, turning down the chance to direct Tomorrow Never Dies. The finished screenplay would be written by John Eskow, Ted Elliott and Terry Rossio, based on a story by Elliott, Rossio, and Randall Jahnson.

Filming
The principal photography for the film began in Mexico on January 27, 1997 on a $60 million budget. The Mask of Zorro was mostly shot at Estudios Churubusco in Mexico City. Production stalled for four days in February when the director, Martin Campbell, was hospitalized for bronchitis. Filming resumed in Tlaxcala, three hours east of Mexico City, where the production crew constructed the Montero hacienda and town set pieces. Sony sent David Foster to join the project as a producer to help fill the void left by Steven Spielberg, Walter F. Parkes, and Laurie MacDonald, who were busy running DreamWorks. Foster and David S. Ward, who went uncredited, re-wrote some scenes; the troubled production caused The Mask of Zorro to go $10 million over its budget. In December, the producers were frustrated by customs agents when some props and other items, including Zorro's plastic sword, were held for nine days. Rossio and Elliott originally planned to have Don Rafael Montero be introduced by arriving on shore in a boat while sitting on a horse standing in the boat, but the scene was cut for being deemed too expensive. The idea was ultimately revisited by the duo for Pirates of the Caribbean: Dead Man's Chest. During the post-production phase, Spielberg and Campbell decided that Diego de la Vega's death in the arms of his daughter was too depressing. The ending, where Alejandro and Eléna are happily married with their infant son, was added three months after filming had ended.

Lawsuit
On January 24, 2001, Sony Pictures Entertainment filed a lawsuit in United States District Court, Central District of California, Western Division, against Fireworks Entertainment Group, the producers of the syndicated television series Queen of Swords. Sony alleged copyright infringement and other claims, saying the series "copied protectable elements from [the] 'Zorro' character and 'Zorro' related works". On April 5, 2001, U.S. District Judge Collins denied Sony's motion for a preliminary injunction, noting "that since the copyrights in [Johnson McCulley's 1919 short story] The Curse of Capistrano and [the 1920 movie] The Mark of Zorro lapsed in 1995 or before, the character Zorro has been in the public domain." As to specific elements of The Mask of Zorro, the judge found that any similarities between the film and the TV series' secondary characters and plot elements were insufficient to warrant an injunction.

Soundtrack

James Horner was hired to compose the film score in September 1997.  The soundtrack, released by Sony Classical Records and Epic Soundtrax, was commercially successful and propelled by the rising profile of the Latin heartthrobs of Marc Anthony and Australian singer Tina Arena. Their duet, "I Want to Spend My Lifetime Loving You", plays in the closing credits of the film and was released as a single in Europe. The song went #3 on the French singles and #4 on the Dutch singles charts.

Historical references
The Mask of Zorro and its sequel The Legend of Zorro incorporate certain historical events and people into their narrative. Antonio Banderas' character, Alejandro Murrieta, is a fictional brother of Joaquin Murrieta, a real Mexican outlaw who was killed by the California State Rangers led by Harry Love (portrayed in the film as Texas Army Captain "Harrison Love") in 1853. The confrontation in the film takes place more than a decade earlier, in 1841. The capture of Murrieta's right-hand man Three-Fingered Jack by Love was also historical; however, the real person was a Mexican named Manuel Garcia rather than an Anglo-American. As he did in the movie, the actual Harry Love preserved both Murrieta's head and Jack's hand in large, alcohol-filled glass jars.

Release
The Mask of Zorro was initially set for release on December 19, 1997 before the release date was changed to March 1998. There was speculation within the media about whether TriStar changed the date in an attempt to avoid competition with Titanic. In reality Zorro had encountered production problems that extended its shooting schedule. In addition, Sony Pictures Entertainment, TriStar's parent company, wanted an action film for its first quarter releases of 1998. The release date was once again pushed back, this time to July 1998, when pick-ups were commissioned. The delay from March to July added $3 million in interest costs.

To market The Mask of Zorro, TriStar purchased a 30-second advertising spot at Super Bowl XXXII for $1.3 million. Sony, who had been known for their low-key presence at the ShoWest trade show, showed clips from the film, while actors Antonio Banderas and Anthony Hopkins presented a panel at the conference on May 10, 1998. The studio also attached the film's trailer to prints of Godzilla. Sony launched an official website in June 1998. Internet marketing was an emerging concept in the late-1990s, and Zorro was Sony's first film to use VRML.

The Mask of Zorro caught the attention of European Royalty with the film's foreign premieres. Spain's King Juan Carlos I, Queen Sophia, and Princess Elena attended the first Royal premiere in Madrid in seven years. On December 10, 1998, a Royal Command Performance for Zorro was toplined by Prince Charles and his sons.

Home media
The Mask of Zorro was released on VHS and DVD on December 1, 1998 by Columbia TriStar Home Video. The film was released on Blu-ray on December 1, 2009 by Sony Pictures Home Entertainment, and in 4K UHD on May 5, 2020.

Reception

Critical response
On Rotten Tomatoes, the film has an approval score of 83% based on 75 reviews, with an average score of 7.1/10. The site's consensus states: "Banderas returns as an aging Zorro in this surprisingly nimble, entertaining swashbuckler." On Metacritic, the film has a score of 63 based on reviews from 22 critics, indicating "generally favorable reviews". Audiences polled by CinemaScore gave the film an average grade of "A−" on an A+ to F scale.

Richard Schickel of Time magazine praised The Mask of Zorro as a summer blockbuster which paid tribute to the classical Hollywood swashbuckler films. "The action in this movie, most of which takes the form of spectacular stunt work performed by real, as opposed to digitized, people," Schickel stated, "is motivated by simple, powerful emotions of an old-fashioned and rather melodramatic nature." Zorro exceeded the expectations of Roger Ebert, who was surprised by the screenplay's display of traditional film craftsmanship. "It's a reminder of the time when stunts and special effects were integrated into stories, rather than the other way around." Ebert gave the film three out of four stars, and would later call it "probably the best Zorro movie ever made." Mick LaSalle, writing in the San Francisco Chronicle gave credit to Anthony Hopkins for his masculine portrayal of an older Zorro, adding that the actor's "performance presents a slight problem: The film asks us to believe that no one has figured out that Zorro and his real-life persona are the same person, even though they are the only guys in Mexico who talk with a British accent."

Todd McCarthy of Variety found the film's length to be "somewhat overlong" and lacking "the snap and concision that would have put it over the top as a bang-up entertainment, but it's closer in spirit to a vintage Errol Flynn or Tyrone Power swashbuckler than anything that's come out of Hollywood in quite some time." In his review for Rolling Stone magazine, Peter Travers criticized the casting choices for the Mexican roles, which included Banderas, a Spaniard, as well as Hopkins and Zeta-Jones, who are both Welsh. Disappointed with the film's entertainment value, Travers also expected the film to be a failure with audiences. Internet reviewer James Berardinelli compared the tone and style of The Mask of Zorro to producer Steven Spielberg's Raiders of the Lost Ark. "While The Mask of Zorro isn't on the same level, it's not an altogether ridiculous comparison. Even though Zorro doesn't feature the non-stop cliffhanger adventure of Raiders," Berardinelli continued, "there's still plenty of action, tumult, and derring-do." He was undecided whether the film would be a box office success, and that it would depend on the on-screen chemistry between Banderas and Zeta-Jones.

In one of the film's most popular scenes, Alejandro renders Eléna topless with a flurry of sword slashes. One critic placed it on his list of "Erotic [Film] Scenes in the 90s".

Box office
The Mask of Zorro was released in the United States on July 17, 1998 in 2,515 theaters, earning $22,525,855 in its opening weekend. The film dropped from its number one position in the second week with the releases of Saving Private Ryan and There's Something About Mary. The Mask of Zorro eventually earned $94,095,523 within the US, and $156,193,000 internationally, coming to a worldwide total of $250,288,523. With the commercial success of the film, Sony sold the television rights of The Mask of Zorro for $30 million in a joint deal to CBS and Turner Broadcasting System.

Accolades

Comic book adaptation
 Image Comics: The Mask of Zorro (August 1998)

References

External links

 
 
 
 
 
 
 

1998 films
1990s action adventure films
1998 Western (genre) films
Amblin Entertainment films
American action adventure films
American Western (genre) films
American heist films
American superhero films
Estudios Churubusco films
Films about American slavery
American films about revenge
Films adapted into comics
Films directed by Martin Campbell
Films scored by James Horner
Films set in California
Films set in prison
Films set in 1821
Films set in 1841
Films shot in Mexico
Pre-statehood history of California
Films with screenplays by Ted Elliott
Films with screenplays by Terry Rossio
American swashbuckler films
TriStar Pictures films
Zorro films
Films based on works by Johnston McCulley
1990s English-language films
1990s American films
Spanish-language American films